Harry Miller may refer to:

Entertainment
 Harry S. Miller (1867–?), American lyricist, composer, and playwright
 Harry M. Miller (1934–2018), Australian promoter and publicist
 Harry Miller (jazz bassist) (1941–1983), South African musician exiled to England, founder of Ogun Records

Sports
 Harry Miller (auto racing) (1875–1943), American racing car builder
 Harry Miller (American football) (1889–?), American football player and coach
 Harry Miller (cricketer) (1907–1966), English cricketer
 Harry Miller (basketball, born 1923) (1923–2007), American basketball player, Toronto Huskies
 Harry Miller (basketball, born 1927) (1927–2013), American college basketball coach at Fresno State, Wichita State and Stephen F. Austin
 Harry Miller (basketball, born 1950), American college basketball coach at Baylor
 Harry Miller (footballer) (born 1985), Australian rules footballer with Hawthorn, drafted in 2003

Other
 Harry Herbert Miller (1879–1968), United States Navy sailor and Medal of Honor recipient
 Harry Willis Miller (1879–1977), physician, thyroid surgeon and Seventh-day Adventist missionary
 Harry Miller (writer) (1923–1998), journalist and naturalist who lived in India
 Harry E. Miller Jr. (born 1958), officer in the Army National Guard
 Harry Miller Middle School, a school in Rothesay, New Brunswick, Canada.

See also
Henry Miller (disambiguation)
Harold Miller (disambiguation)
Harrison Miller (disambiguation)
Harry Millar, footballer, see List of Queens Park Rangers F.C. seasons